The Vicious Brothers are Canadian-American filmmakers Colin Minihan and Stuart Ortiz. They are best known for writing and directing the cult horror film, Grave Encounters and for writing and producing its sequel, Grave Encounters 2. They also wrote and produced Extraterrestrial, which Minihan solo directed.

In 2015, The Vicious Brothers had premiered their 15-part anime called Temple which was based on The Guest screenwriter Simon Barrett. In May of the same year The Brothers had announced that they are making Grave Encounters 3: The Beginning.
In February 2020, a reboot of the 1998 slasher film Urban Legend was announced to be in development, with Minihan writing and directing.

Filmography
2011: Grave Encounters (writers/directors/editors)
2012: Grave Encounters 2 (writers/producers/editors)
2014: Extraterrestrial (writers, Minihan directing)
2017: It Stains the Sands Red (writers, Minihan directing)
2018: What Keeps You Alive (Minihan writing and directing)
2019: Spiral (Minihan writing and producing)
TBA: Urban Legend (Minihan writing and directing)

Awards and nominations

References

External links

Canadian film directors
Canadian male screenwriters
English-language film directors
Horror film directors
Living people
Year of birth missing (living people)
21st-century Canadian screenwriters
21st-century Canadian male writers